The Radix Tetrad is a group of four science fiction books by A. A. Attanasio.  The first novel, the Nebula Award-nominated Radix, was published in 1981, and the last novel, The Last Legends of Earth, was published in 1989.

All four books of the Tetrad are being re-issued by Phoenix Pick, an imprint of Arc Manor Publishers.

The Tetrad
Radix (1981)
In Other Worlds (1984)
Arc of the Dream (1986)
The Last Legends of Earth (1989)

References

External links
Radix Tetrad Site

Science fiction book series